The Hanul Science Museum is a science museum in Seoul, South Korea.

See also
List of museums in South Korea

External links
Official site

Museums in Seoul
Science and technology in South Korea
Science museums in South Korea